The Trianon Mosque, also known as the Old Mosque is a historical Ottoman mosque in the town of Nafplio, Peloponnese, in Greece. It is the oldest surviving example of Ottoman architecture in Nafplion. During the Ottoman rule it was located in the Grand Vizier's quarter or the quarter of Sultan Ahmed, in the center of the town's market. Today it functions as a cinema and a cultural venue.

History 
It was constructed towards the end of the sixteenth century, or perhaps shortly before 1666-1667, during the first period of Ottoman rule in the area. When the Venetians took over the Peloponnese in 1687, it was converted into a church dedicated to Saint Anthony of Padua, but it was made back into a mosque upon the 1715 Ottoman reconquest.

During the first years of the Greek War of Independence, around 1823, it was used to house the Charitable Society of Nafplio, which tended to the poor, the sick, and children orphaned during the war, as well as educate these children. Upon Greece's independence in 1830, it was converted into a mutual-teaching school for poor families (a type of school where older students teach the younger ones); the first governor of Greece, Ioannis Kapodistrias, further enforced the institution on his own expense.

King Otto of Greece abolished the mutual-teaching type of school, and established instead state-sponsored schools in their place. For fifty-three years, from 1831 to 1884, Trianon Mosque functioned as a school before it was closed due to health concerns. For some years it worked as the Nafplio Magistrate's Court as well as the town's metropolitan church. In 1893 it was renovated and turned into a conservatory and a theater, and then in 1937 it was turned into the Trianon municipal cinema, by which name the former mosque is known to the residents of Nafplio today. Since 1993 it has been the seat of the Municipal Theater of Nafplio, while it is also used for cultural events and exhibitions. It is one of Nafplio's smallest cinemas.

Architecture 
Built with brick and stone, Trianon Mosque is a building with a simple rectangular plan, and an octagonal dome. Its entrance has an arched, colonnaded porch sheltered by three smaller domes; to the west of the building there used to be a small courtyard, which is not preserved today. Due to its various usage throughout history, the building has undergone many changes from its original form. The mosque is simple, without special features, tributes, decorations or large minarets. In order to serve the needs arising from the new functions, false ceilings were added in 1915, thus covering the domes, internal staircases and reinforced concrete mezzanine. Today Trianon Mosque is not entirely visible, since a part of the lower part of the building has been buried as the soil rose, while the narthex with the columns has been covered with a wall.

Ottoman traveller Evliya Çelebi who visited Nafplio recorded the existence of three mosques, two on the market place, and described them both as stone mosques with brick domes, and a minaret made of stone as well. Trianon Mosque is located about 100  meters from the Agha Pasha Mosque, most commonly known as the Vuleftikon Mosque, on the other side of the Syntagma Square.

See also 

 Islam in Greece
 List of former mosques in Greece
 List of mosques in Greece
 Ottoman Greece

References

Bibliography 
 
 

Ottoman mosques in Greece
Former mosques in Greece
Mosque buildings with domes
Buildings and structures in Argolis
Ottoman Peloponnese
Nafplion
16th-century mosques
16th-century architecture in Greece
Mosques completed in the 1660s
Churches converted from mosques